Via Panisperna boys (Italian: I ragazzi di Via Panisperna) is the name given to a group of young Italian scientists led by Enrico Fermi, who worked at the Royal Physics Institute of the University of Rome La Sapienza. In 1934 they made the famous discovery of slow neutrons, which later made possible the nuclear reactor and then the construction of the first atomic bomb.

The nickname of the group comes from the address of the Institute, located in a street of Rione Monti in the city centre, which got its name from a nearby monastery, San Lorenzo in Panisperna.

The other members of the group were Edoardo Amaldi, Oscar D'Agostino, Ettore Majorana, Bruno Pontecorvo, Franco Rasetti and Emilio Segrè. All were physicists, except for D'Agostino, who was a chemist.

The growth of the group

The group grew under the supervision of the physicist, minister, senator and director of the Institute of Physics Orso Mario Corbino. Corbino recognized the qualities of Enrico Fermi and led the commission which appointed him in 1926 to one of the first three professorships in Theoretical Physics in Italy. From 1929, Fermi and Corbino dedicated themselves to the transformation of the institute into a modern research centre.

Rasetti and Fermi were contemporaries, who had met as undergraduates at Pisa, and worked together in Florence. The first of the Boys to join them was Segrè, who had been studying engineering. Segrè had got to know Rasetti though mountaineering and then been drawn into physics by their gatecrashing the first Volta Conference on Lake Como together. Amaldi as a schoolboy already knew Fermi through his father, a mathematician; the families had hiked together in the Dolomites. Later Corbino encouraged Amaldi as a young engineering student to switch to physics. Majorana had also been an engineering student; he switched to physics after his mathematical ability was recognised by Segrè, leading to an interview with Fermi. D'Agostino became involved because he was a chemist; he had been the assistant to Giulio Trabacchi, with whom the group collaborated because he had a supply of radium Pontecorvo joined the group later (1934); he came to Rome as a postgraduate to work with Rasetti, a family friend..

Research
The first version of their research laboratory was mainly dedicated to atomic and molecular spectroscopy; afterwards, they moved towards experimental studies of the atomic nucleus. Research included the bombarding of various elements with neutrons, generated by irradiating beryllium with alpha particles emitted by the radioactive gas radon, obtained from radium. The neutrons induced reactions in the target's nuclei resulting in the generation of other elements, often radioactive isotopes. A key discovery, partly by chance, was that neutrons slowed down by hydrogen nuclei were far more likely to be captured by the nuclei. Five of the Boys patented this idea, which was crucial in harnessing nuclear power, but the long-delayed financial reward was only modest. On the theoretical side, the work of Ettore Majorana and Fermi advanced the understanding of the structure of the atomic nucleus and the forces acting within it. In 1933 and 1934 they published the fundamental theory of beta decay.

The work on neutron-induced radioactivity involved a degree of cooperation unusual at the time, and the later papers had five authors. The roles were not strictly delineated, but D'Agostino was the specialist chemist, Amaldi was responsible for the electronics, and Segrè obtained the elements to be irradiated. The working atmosphere involved a camaraderie and playfulness exemplified by the nicknames bestowed on one another. Fermi was "Il Papa" (the Pope), because of his infallibility. Rasetti, his right-hand man, was "Cardinal Vicario". Even higher in this ecclesiastical hierarchy, the nickname of Corbino was "Padreterno" (God Almighty), for his ability to miraculously generate funds and positions. Majorana was "Il Gran Inquisitore" (The Grand Inquisitor), because of his critical manner. Segrè's judgemental disposition earned him the nickname "Basilisco" after the legendary Basilisk. Amaldi was "Fanciulletto" (young boy) because of his cherubic face. Pontecorvo was "Cucciolo" (puppy dog). Another key component of the collaborative atmosphere was the masterful impromptu talks that Fermi delivered every afternoon on topics of interest to their research.

The group disperses
By 1935 the group had dispersed with only Fermi and Amaldi continuing work together: Rasetti was away for a year in the U.S.; Segrè had a professorship in Palermo, D'Agostino had a job elsewhere in Rome, Pontecorvo was in Paris. Majorana had become reclusive and in 1938 would disappear in unexplained circumstances.

Subsequently, the Italian racial laws caused further emigration. (Segrè and Pontecorvo were Jewish, as was Fermi's wife.) On 6 December 1938, Fermi left Rome with his family for Stockholm to receive the Nobel Prize, and from there they emigrated permanently to the U.S. D'Agostino and Amaldi were the only ones who remained in Italy. After the war, Fermi's and Segrè's involvement in the development of the atomic bomb may have caused some strain in their relations with Rasetti, who had refused to participate. It also made it awkward to discuss nuclear physics with their former colleagues when the new discoveries often remained classified.

In the media
The film director Gianni Amelio has told their story in a TV movie which became a film, I ragazzi di via Panisperna (1989).

The building in Via Panisperna, lying on the Viminale hill, is today included in the complex of the Ministry of the Interior. The edifice is planned to host a centre for research and a museum of physics named after Enrico Fermi.

References

Further reading 
La scienza. Molecole, atomi, particelle. Vol. 12. La biblioteca di Repubblica. Rome, La Repubblica-UTET, 2005.

External links 
 Enrico Fermi and the Via Panisperna Boys from the Museum of Physics of "La Sapienza" University in Rome

Italian nuclear physicists
Sapienza University of Rome
Enrico Fermi